Francis Mellersh may refer to:

Francis Mellersh (cricketer) (1786–1849), English cricketer
Francis Mellersh (RAF officer) (1898–1955), World War I fighter ace and later Air Vice Marshal
Francis Richard Lee Mellersh, British World War II fighter ace, later Air Vice Marshal, son of the above